T-money is a rechargeable series of smart cards and other "smart" devices used for paying transportation fares in and around Seoul and other areas of South Korea. T-money can also be used in lieu of cash or credit cards in some convenience stores and other businesses. The T-money System has been implemented and is being operated by T-money Co., Ltd of which 34.4% owned by Seoul Special City Government, 31.85% owned by LG CNS, and 15.73% owned by Credit Card Union.

History 

 22 April 2004 : City government announced the name of new transit card called T-money. "T" stands for travel, touch, traffic and technology.
 June 2004 : T-money terminals installed at stations. Several bugs had to be ironed out before full operation.
 1 July 2004 : System officially inaugurated, with a day of free transit for all.
 15 October 2005 : Incheon public transit system started to accept T-money.
 6 December 2005 : T-money Internet refilling service started.
 13 November 2006 : Gyeonggi-do transit system started to partially accept T-money.
 4 August 2008 : Busan urban buses started to accept T-money.

Usage 
Similar to its predecessor, the "Seoul Bus Card", T-money can be used to pay for bus, subway and some taxi fares. As of March 2017, T-money is accepted by:
 All Seoul, Gyeonggi-do, Incheon, Busan, Daegu, Daejeon, and Gwangju buses
 Seoul, Incheon, Busan, Daegu, Daejeon, and Gwangju Metropolitan Subway networks
 AREX, U Line, EverLine, Shinbundang Line, Donghae Line (Metro) and Busan–Gimhae Light Rail Transit
 All Sejong Special Autonomous City, Chungcheongnam-do and Chungcheongbuk-do buses
 All Gangwon-do buses
 All Gyeongsangbuk-do and Gyeongsangnam-do buses with dongle
 All Jeollabuk-do, Jeollanam-do, and Jeju Special Autonomous Province buses with dongle
 Korail ticket office
 Toll booth operated by Korea Expressway Corporation
 Express bus with E-Pass dongle 

Some stores and attractions including Seoul's four palaces (except Gyeonghuigung), Lotte World amusement park, Kyobo Book Centre, GS 25, CU/FamilyMart and other selected convenience stores accept T-money as payment method.

Card types

Standard 
T-money cards cost 2,500 - 4,000 won and can be purchased and recharged at metro stations, bank ATMs, convenience stores and kiosks located adjacent to bus stops. Self-service recharge machines are also available at Seoul and Busan metro stations.

In 2014, "One Card All Pass"-enabled T-money was introduced. It holds "One Card All Pass" logo, and bears slightly different card number system compared to generic T-money. As of March 2016, "One Card All Pass" T-money is accepted at major retailers, most express bus and some intercity bus routes, express road toll booth, Korail railroad station, all metro system, and all bus system except Gimhae.

Discount cards 
There are two types of discount cards available for sale, one for teenagers (age 13-18) and the other for children (age 7-12). One needs a proper ID such as a Youth Card or Student ID in order to purchase these cards. Discount cards must be registered via the Internet within 10 days after first use.  Registration requires the number on the card, and a National ID number or Foreigner registration number, or, there is a form available on the t-money website (under English Errors) that can be emailed to customer service along with supporting documentation. Senior citizens are entitled to free transportation and can pick up free tickets at ticket machine in Seoul metropolitan subway stations with proper ID.

T-money accessories 

Smaller, more durable T-money cards with a lanyard for easy attachment to cell phones are also available, for about 6,000~8,000 won. Watches, dolls, MP3 players, portable memory sticks, rings and bands containing T-money chips are also on sale.

Related cards 
Metro Pass (정기권), a monthly pass for the Seoul and Incheon subway systems available at stations.
T-money Mpass, a one-day transportation card incorporating the Seoul City Tour Bus ticket and limited use of the metropolitan transportation system.
Seoul Citypass Plus is a T-money with extra benefits at tourist spots.
Mobile T-money is a RF-/NFC-Subscriber Identity Module based T-money service. Mobile T-money application is available on Google Play and each mobile service provider's ESD.

Other cards 
eB Card (eBest Card, used in Gyeonggi & Incheon province), now discontinued. → See cashBee.
Sensepass T-money, previously Topcash T-money, sold in the Gyeongsangnam and Gyeongsangbuk Provinces except Andong. Not wholly compatible with Smart T-money.
Hankkumi card, sold in Daejeon. This is a rebranded version of Smart T-money.
POP card, sold in GS25. This is a rebranded Smart T-money with GS&Point and Happy Point loyalty card.
Narasarang Card, issued by Shinhan Card·Shinhan Bank and NMD/MMA. This is a K-Cash enabled debit card with POP card functionality. This card is only issued to ROTC officers and ROK Armed Forces enlisted person including KATUSA.

See also 
 RFID

References

External links
 Official site in Korean and in English
Seoul Citypass
T-Money: Seoul Official Tourism
Official site Hankkumi card

Smart cards
Contactless smart cards
Fare collection systems in South Korea
Transport in Seoul
Financial services companies of South Korea